Diego Aduarte OP (1570–1636; born in Zaragoza) was a Spanish Dominican friar and historian. He was a missionary to the Philippine Islands and in 1632 was made Prior of Manila, where he died in 1637.

Aduarte works include an account of the difficulties and problems faced by Spanish missionaries introducing Christianity into Cambodia.

External links
 

1570 births
1636 deaths
People from Zaragoza
Spanish Dominicans
Roman Catholic missionaries in the Philippines
Spanish expatriates in the Philippines
17th-century Spanish historians
Spanish Roman Catholic missionaries
Dominican missionaries
17th-century Roman Catholic bishops in the Philippines
Roman Catholic bishops of Nueva Segovia